This article is the discography of English rock and roll singer and guitarist Joe Brown.

Albums

Studio albums

Live albums

Soundtrack albums

Cast recording albums

Compilation albums

Video albums

EPs

Singles

Notes 

Discographies of British artists
Rock music discographies

References